Pura Sakmana (Bitter Harvest) is a 2007 Sri Lankan Sinhala  film directed by Tikiri Ratnayake and produced by Sama Rathnayake. It stars Anoja Weerasinghe and Kanchana Mendis in lead roles along with Hemasiri Liyanage and Cletus Mendis. Music composed by Navaratne Gamage. It is the 1001st Sri Lankan film in the Sinhala cinema.

Plot

Cast
 Anoja Weerasinghe as Gunawathi
 Kanchana Mendis
 Hemasiri Liyanage
 Janaka Kumbukage
 Richard Weerakody
 Cletus Mendis
 Duleeka Marapana
 Grace Ariyawimal
 Vinnie Wettasinghe

Screening 
The film was screened at 26th Cairo Intentional Film Festival and Asian Film Festival in Mumbai.

References

2003 films
2000s Sinhala-language films